

Abọ foto

Abeokuta South  is a Local Government Area in Ogun State, Nigeria. The headquarters of the LGA are at Ake Abeokuta.

It has an area of 71 km and a population of 250,278 at the 2006 census.

The postal code of the area is 110.

It was represented by Dimeji Bankole, the former speaker of the House of Representatives, from 2003 to 2011.

See also
Abeokuta

References

Local Government Areas in Ogun State
Local Government Areas in Yorubaland